Gerard “Jerry” Del Colliano (born April 6, 1974) is an American entrepreneur and publisher of online luxury publications.

Del Colliano was born in Philadelphia to Gerard Anthony Del Colliano and Judy Del Colliano. He grew up in the Chestnut Hill neighborhood of Philadelphia after his parents divorced in 1977. Del Colliano attended prep school at Chestnut Hill Academy for 13 years. Del Colliano attended The University of Southern California from 1993 to 1997 earning a Bachelor of Science in Music Industry.

Early career 
Before moving to Los Angeles to attend music and business school, Del Colliano worked as a commissioned audio-video salesman at Bryn Mawr Stereo in Abington, Pennsylvania and Sassafras Audio in Bryn Mawr, Pennsylvania. Upon moving to Los Angeles, he was a top-producing audiophile salesman at Christopher Hansen Ltd. in Beverly Hills. In late 1994, Del Colliano was recruited to work for Mark Levinson at the West Hollywood showroom for Cello Music and Film Systems.
In April 1996, funded with an $11,600 commission from the sale of a large audiophile home theater system to professional poker player Howard Lederer, Del Colliano created AudioRevolution.com, one of the first online magazines designed to compete with printed enthusiast stereo magazines.

Sale of AVRev.com 
On February 29, 2008, Gerard Del Colliano sold AVRev.com, ModernHomeTheater.com and AVRevForum.com  at the time a publicly traded company based in El Segundo, California. Del Colliano remained with the publication through July 2008 to help with the transition.

Luxury Publishing Group Inc. 
While transitioning out of AVRev.com in July 2008, Del Colliano created Luxury Publishing Group Inc. which became the parent company of HomeTheaterReview.com. He additionally created the audiophile blog AudiophileReview.com. In 2009, Del Colliano purchased the assets of AV forum HomeTheaterSpot.com and merged its users into a new enthusiast forum at HomeTheaterEquipment.com. Today, the Luxury Publishing Group audio-video portfolio of sites collectively competes favorably with competitors like HomeTheater.com, SoundandVisionMag.com and parts of CNET.com.

Family 
Jerry Del Colliano married Krista Louise Del Colliano (Lambly) on May 5, 2007, in Los Angeles. They have one child, Enzo.

References

1974 births
Living people